Artur Ioniță (born 17 August 1990) is a Moldovan professional footballer who plays as a midfielder for  club Modena on loan from Pisa, and the Moldova national team.

Club career
Artur Ioniță made his professional debut at the Moldovan Divizia Națională club Zimbru Chișinău in 2007. In the 2008–09 season he played for FC Iskra-Stal Rîbniţa.

From 2009 to 2014 he played for the Swiss team FC Aarau, with which he transferred from the Swiss Challenge League to the Swiss Super League.

Ioniță was then transferred to Italian Serie A club Hellas Verona in July 2014 on a free transfer. He made his début against Atalanta, as a substitute for Mounir Obbadi. At Hellas Verona, Ioniță became teammates with one of his idols Rafael Márquez.

Ioniță scored his first goal for Hellas during his second appearance for the club, as a substitute in the second half of the match and securing a goal against Torino F.C. on the 65th minute giving his team a 1–0 win. This made him the first Moldovan footballer to score a goal in Serie A.

He scored his second goal for Hellas Verona in a game against Genoa, playing the full 90 minutes of the game; also providing an assist for Panagiotis Tachtsidis on the 52nd minute.

After an impressive 2015–16 season in Serie A in which he scored 4 goals and provided 2 assists in 31 matches, Ioniță was targeted by Juventus, Napoli and Swansea.

In July 2016, Ioniță transferred to newly promoted Serie A club, Cagliari.

On 20 August 2020, Ioniță signed a contract with Benevento ahead of their return to Serie A.

On 11 August 2022, Ioniță moved to Pisa on a two-year contract. On 31 January 2023, he was loaned to Modena.

International career
Ioniță made his debut appearance for Moldova in 2009, in the 2010 FIFA World Cup qualification match against Switzerland. Moldova lost the match 0–2. He scored his first international goal during a 5–2 win in Podgorica against Montenegro and then scored again in a 1–1 draw at home to Lithuania.

Career statistics

International goals
Scores and results list Moldova's goal tally first.

Honours

Club
Aarau	
Swiss Challenge League: 2012–13

Individual
Moldovan Footballer of the Year: 2014, 2019

References

External links
 Artur Ioniţă player info at Sport1.de 
 Swiss Super League profile 

1990 births
Living people
Footballers from Chișinău
Moldovan footballers
Association football midfielders
FC Zimbru Chișinău players
FC Aarau players
FC Iskra-Stal players
Hellas Verona F.C. players
Cagliari Calcio players
Benevento Calcio players
Pisa S.C. players
Modena F.C. 2018 players
Swiss Super League players
Serie A players
Serie B players
Moldova international footballers
Moldovan expatriate footballers
Expatriate footballers in Switzerland
Moldovan expatriate sportspeople in Switzerland
Expatriate footballers in Italy
Moldovan expatriate sportspeople in Italy